Châtillon-sur-Loire (literally Châtillon on Loire) is a commune in the Loiret department in north-central France.

See also
 Communes of the Loiret department

References

Chatillonsurloire